Mean difference may refer to:
 Mean absolute difference, a measure of statistical dispersion
 Mean signed difference, a measure of central tendency

See also
Mean deviation (disambiguation)